is a masculine Japanese given name.

Possible writings
Manabu can be written using different kanji characters and can mean:
as a given name
学, "learn"
The name can also be written in hiragana or katakana.

People
Manabu Horii (学, born 1972), Japanese speed skater
Manabu Kitabeppu (学, born 1957), Japanese professional baseball pitcher
 , Japanese professional baseball pitcher
Manabu Miyazaki (学), Japanese writer and social critic
Manabu Miyazaki (photographer) (学, born 1949), Japanese wildlife photographer
Manabu Murakami (学 or 學, born 1936), Japanese literary scholar
Manabu Murakami (学, born 1984), Japanese professional wrestler
, Japanese footballer
Manabu Nakanishi (学, born 1967), Japanese professional wrestler
Manabu Namiki (学, born 1971), Japanese video game music composer
Manabu Orido (学, born 1968), Japanese racing driver
, Japanese voice actor
Manabu Sakai (学, born 1965), Japanese politician
Manabu Senzaki (学, born 1970), Japanese shogi player
, Japanese racing driver, journalist and sports announcer
, Japanese biathlete
Manabu Terata (学, born 1971), Japanese politician
, Japanese footballer
, Japanese footballer
Manabu Yamada (born 1969), Japanese mixed martial arts fighter
, Japanese pole vaulter
Screw (band) guitarist Manabu (born 1985)

Fictional characters
Manabu Itagaki (学), a character in the manga and anime series Fighting Spirit
Manabu Kudō (学), a character in the 1997 film Welcome Back, Mr. McDonald
Manabu Miyazawa, a character in the manga series BECK
Manabu Takagi (まなぶ), a minor character in the anime series Ojamajo Doremi
Manabu Takasaki, a character from the anime and manga series Nichijou
Manabu Yamaji (学), a character in the tokusatsu drama series Sekai Ninja Sen Jiraiya
Manabu-San, a minor character in the manga Riki-Oh.

Japanese masculine given names